Collinsville is a city located mainly in Madison County and partially in St. Clair County, Illinois, United States. As of the 2020 census, the city had a population of 24,366.

Collinsville is the location of Cahokia Mounds State Historic Site, a National Historic Landmark and UNESCO World Heritage Site. This prehistoric urban complex is estimated to have had a population of thousands at its peak, long before European exploration in the area. The city is also known for the Brooks Catsup Bottle Water Tower, the world's largest ketchup bottle, and is billed as the world's horseradish capital.

History
Cahokia, the largest Pre-Columbian settlement north of Mexico, was developed by the Mississippian culture and is located in what is now the westernmost part of Collinsville. At its peak about 1200 CE, Cahokia had a population of 20,000-30,000, more than any city in the present-day United States until after 1800. It includes Monks Mound, the largest prehistoric earthwork in the Americas, and more than 70 surviving smaller mounds. Monks Mound is larger at its base than the Great Pyramid of Giza.

During the French colonial era of its Illinois Country, a group of French Catholic monks had a settlement on Monks Mound, after whom it was later named. They cultivated agriculture on the terraces of the mound. They traded with bands of the historic Illini, who had migrated into the area after the peak of the Mississippian culture.

Collinsville was subsequently settled by the Cook family and by a group of German-American settlers who arrived by Conestoga wagon in 1812 from Pennsylvania. They founded Holy Cross Lutheran Church. They also had a hardware store, though they were mainly farmers. Within five or six years, a number of other settlers arrived and began to organize the legal work required to form a town on the site. These original settlers are all buried in the Cook Cemetery or the Old Lutheran Cemetery. Other early settlers are buried in the Old German Cemetery near Sugarloaf Road near Maryville.

During World War I, a Collinsville mob, composed mostly of local coal miners, lynched a German immigrant, the only such wartime murder in the country. On April 5, 1918, the mob numbering up to 300 men took Robert Prager from his home and paraded him through the streets barefoot and wrapped in an American flag, forcing him to sing patriotic songs. Collinsville police interceded and took Prager into protective custody. The mob was later mistakenly allowed to search city hall, and two men found Prager hiding in the basement. They took Prager outside and the mob marched him to the outskirts of town, along the St. Louis Road, where they lynched him. His final request was to be buried in the American flag. Eleven men stood trial for the murder, but all were acquitted on June 1, 1918.

Several historical buildings survive in Collinsville. Built in 1885, the City Hall is still used today. It was built on property originally owned by the Collins family. The building features Italianate architecture with window crowns. A short, half-block walk from City Hall is the former State Bank of Collinsville at the corner of Center and Main streets. Designed in 1916 by architect Robert G. Kirsch, this structure features a limestone exterior and marble interior walls. To the west on Main Street, the Collinsville Public Library is a colonial-style brick building with an inviting circular stone walkway; the first section was completed in 1937. Additional wings were added in 1967 and 1980.

Geography
Two portions of the city extend south into St. Clair County. Collinsville is bordered to the north by Maryville, to the west by Pontoon Beach and Fairmont City, and to the south by Caseyville. The 90W longitude line passes through Collinsville, west of the city center.

The city is drained to the northwest by Schoolhouse Branch and to the south by Canteen Creek, both of which flow west into the Mississippi River valley in the western part of the city.

Interstates 55 and 70 run concurrently through the north side of Collinsville, with access from Exits 9 through 15, while Interstate 255 passes through the west side of the city, with access from Exits 24 and 26. Illinois Route 159 passes through the center of Collinsville as Morrison Avenue and Vandalia Street, leading north  to Edwardsville and south  to Fairview Heights, while Route 157 (Bluff Road) crosses the west side of the city, leading north  to Glen Carbon and south  to Caseyville.

Demographics

As of the census of 2010, there were 25,579 people, 10,458 households, and 6,672 families residing in the city. The racial makeup of the city was 87.4% White, 11.2% African American, 0.8% Native American, 1.1% Asian, 0.1% Pacific Islander, and 1.7% from other races (according to the "race alone of in combination" section of the Census Summary File 1).

There were 10,458 households, out of which 29.3% had children under the age of 18 living with them, 48.1% were married couples living together, 11.9% had a female householder with no husband present, and 36.2% were non-families. 30.1% of all households were made up of individuals, and 11.8% had someone living alone who was 65 years of age or older. The average household size was 2.35 and the average family size was 2.94.

In the city, the age distribution of the population shows 23.2% under the age of 18, 9.7% from 18 to 24, 30.5% from 25 to 44, 21.9% from 45 to 64, and 14.6% who were 65 years of age or older. The median age was 37 years. For every 100 females, there were 93.3 males. For every 100 females age 18 and over, there were 88.3 males.

The median income for a household in the city was $42,353, and the median income for a family was $54,956. Males had a median income of $39,379 versus $27,409 for females. The per capita income for the city was $22,048. About 5.6% of families and 7.2% of the population were below the poverty line, including 11.2% of those under age 18 and 6.6% of those age 65 or over.

Culture 
Collinsville is the self-proclaimed "Horseradish Capital of the World", and sponsors an annual Horseradish Festival. The area is said  to produce 85% of the world's horseradish, of such high quality that Germany and China (key users of the herb) import it for gourmet use. The Horseradish Festival is held annually during the first weekend in June at Woodland Park located off Route 159 in Collinsville. It has activities for all ages, including a 5K run, live music, a beauty pageant, and root-grinding demonstrations.

Known for its large ethnic Italian population, descendants of late 19th and early 20th-century immigrants, Collinsville hosts an annual Italian Fest in the fall. The Italian Fest has been held annually since 1983 and is located in uptown Collinsville on Main Street. This two-day festival features live music and vendors selling authentic Italian food such as spedini, spumoni, bagna cauda, cannoli, and Italian Ices. Other activities include a parade, midnight bike ride, 5K Run/Walk, Little Miss & Mister Pageant, Bocce Ball Tournament, and a grape stomp.

Collinsville is the site of the Brooks Catsup Bottle Water Tower, "the world's largest catsup bottle", a  water tower in the shape of a ketchup bottle, which is listed on the National Register of Historic Places. The bottle along with the property was put up for sale for $500,000.00 on July 12, 2014. In order to celebrate this roadside landmark, Collinsville hosts an annual World's Largest Catsup Bottle Festival in July.

The Fairmount Park Racetrack for horse racing is located in Collinsville. The racetrack is owned by the corporation Ogden-Fairmount Incorporated. This is one of five race tracks in Illinois, and the only one located outside Chicago. Fairmont Park Racetrack features a one-mile oval dirt track and opened in 1925. The racetrack originally hosted both Thoroughbred flat racing and Standardbred harness racing. The racetrack has hosted popular races, including the Fairmont Derby in the 1920s and the St. Louis Derby in 2006, along with other weekly live races. Three restaurants are located at the track for visitors to enjoy: the Top of the Turf, the Black Stallion Room, and the 1st Turn Café. Admission for live racing is $1.50 per person on Tuesdays and $2.50 per person on Fridays and Saturdays.

The Cahokia Mounds State Historic Site is located within the city limits of Collinsville. This large park has been designated as a National Historic Landmark and was one of the first eight UNESCO World Heritage Sites designated within the United States; today there are a total of 23.  A museum and visitors' center provide a movie and displays which present the lives of the ancient inhabitants.

Notable people 

 Michelle Bartsch-Hackley, Team USA Olympic volleyball player and professional volleyball player; grew up in Collinsville
 Art Fletcher, shortstop with the New York Giants and Philadelphia Phillies; born in Collinsville
 Moses Harrison, Illinois jurist; born in Collinsville
 Tanner Houck, pitcher drafted as the 24th overall pick by the Boston Red Sox during the 2017 MLB Draft; grew up in Collinsville
 Tom Jager, Olympic gold medalist in swimming; went to Collinsville High School
 Jerry Kane, first baseman and catcher for the St. Louis Browns; born in Collinsville
 Tony Malinosky, third baseman and shortstop for the Brooklyn Dodgers; born in Collinsville
 George M. McCormick, Illinois state senator; lived in Collinsville
 James O. Monroe, Illinois state legislator and newspaper editor; lived in Collinsville
 Terry Moore, center fielder for the St. Louis Cardinals; lived and died in Collinsville
 George Musso, Football Hall of Fame lineman for the Chicago Bears; born in Collinsville
 Ken Oberkfell, former infielder St. Louis Cardinals 1982 World Series Champ went to Collinsville High School
 Alexandra Picatto, former child actress; born in Collinsville
 Robert Prager, German immigrant who was lynched in Collinsville during World War I
 Joe Reiniger, forward for the St. Louis Illusion (Major Indoor Soccer League-MISL)
 John Shimkus, US congressman; born in Collinsville
 Kevin Stallings, former college basketball coach; born in Collinsville
 Michael Stipe, lead singer of R.E.M.; graduated from high school in Collinsville
 Daniel A. Vallero, research scientist; author; adjunct professor of engineering at Duke University; grew up in Collinsville

References

External links

Collinsville Chamber of Commerce
Cahokia Mounds State Historic Site and Cahokia Mounds Museum Society

Cities in Illinois
Cities in Madison County, Illinois
Cities in St. Clair County, Illinois
Italian-American culture in Illinois